Lamb is a 2015 Ethiopian drama film directed by Yared Zeleke. It was screened in the Un Certain Regard section at the 2015 Cannes Film Festival. It was the first Ethiopian film to be included in the Official Selection. It was screened in the Contemporary World Cinema section of the 2015 Toronto International Film Festival. The film was selected as the Ethiopian entry for the Best Foreign Language Film at the 88th Academy Awards but it was not nominated.

Plot
An Ethiopian boy whose mother recently died is placed by his father with relatives, together with his sheep. His host wants him to sacrifice his lamb for the upcoming religious feast, and the homesick boy decides to protect his sheep in the hopes of returning to his home village.

Cast
 Rediat Amare as Ephraïm
 Kidist Siyum as Tsion
 Welela Assefa as Emama
 Surafel Teka as Solomon
 Rahel Teshome as Azeb
 Indris Mohamed as Abraham
 Bitania Abraham as Mimi

Reception
Marinell Haegelin wrote for kinoctics.com this film was "part poignant drama, part travelogue". The cast was praised as "endear(ing)".

See also
 List of submissions to the 88th Academy Awards for Best Foreign Language Film
 List of Ethiopian submissions for the Academy Award for Best Foreign Language Film

References

External links
 

2015 films
2015 drama films
2015 directorial debut films
Ethiopian drama films
Amharic-language films
Films about sheep